Jarrettsville is an unincorporated community and census-designated place (CDP) in Harford County, Maryland, United States. The population was 2,888 at the 2020 census.

History
The area was originally called Carmon. The town was named for the Jarrett family, who farmed the area during the 1800s and were one of the first pioneer families of the United States. In 1771, Abraham Jarrett was granted 2,380 acres of land near the falling branch area to which was used for the production of hogshead barrels mainly used for the transportation of tobacco. In the same year Abraham Jarrett purchased other areas in and around the Jarrettsville area. Abraham Jarrett married Martha Bussey and had 7 children. My Lady's Manor was listed on the National Register of Historic Places in 1978, and includes portions of Jarrettsville. Other sources attribute the naming of Jarrettsville to the grandson of Abraham Jarrett, Luther M. Jarrett, a state delegate and farmer.

Geography
Jarrettsville is located in northwestern Harford County at  (39.601954, −76.472404). Maryland Route 23 passes through the center of the town, leading southeast  to Bel Air, the county seat, and northwest  to the Pennsylvania border north of Norrisville. Maryland Route 165 passes through the center of Jarrettsville as well, leading northeast 12 miles to the Pennsylvania border near Cardiff and south  to Baldwin.

Demographics

As of the census of 2000, there were 2,756 people, 900 households, and 781 families residing in the CDP. The racial makeup of the CDP was 97.21% White, 1.16% African American, 0.15% Native American, 0.29% Asian, 0.33% from other races, and 0.87% from two or more races. Hispanic or Latino of any race were 0.54% of the population.

There were 900 households, out of which 43.7% had children under the age of 18 living with them, 77.6% were married couples living together, 6.4% had a female householder with no husband present, and 13.2% were non-families. 11.1% of all households were made up of individuals, and 5.4% had someone living alone who was 65 years of age or older. The average household size was 3.05 and the average family size was 3.30.

In the CDP, the population was spread out, with 28.9% under the age of 18, 6.5% from 18 to 24, 26.4% from 25 to 44, 29.0% from 45 to 64, and 9.2% who were 65 years of age or older. The median age was 39 years. For every 100 females, there were 101.3 males. For every 100 females age 18 and over, there were 97.3 males.

The median income for a household in the CDP was $69,632, and the median income for a family was $81,771. Males had a median income of $51,524 versus $31,905 for females. The per capita income for the CDP was $29,246. None of the families and 1.4% of the population were living below the poverty line, including no under eighteens and 11.6% of those over 64.

Notable people
 Mel Kiper Jr., ESPN NFL draft day analyst
 Randy McMillan, former NFL running back with the Baltimore/Indianapolis Colts

References

Census-designated places in Harford County, Maryland
Census-designated places in Maryland